Chaman Zar may refer to:
 Chaman Zar-e Olya
 Chaman Zar-e Sofla